Brandon Caskey is an American rapper, better known by the mononym Caskey. After almost ten years with Keep Pushin Entertainment & releasing mixtapes independently, including No Complaints (2012), Caskey signed to Birdman's Cash Money Records and Republic Records in August 2012. On August 1, 2017, Caskey dropped Generation. In 2018, after releasing a new mixtape titled "Speak of the Devil," Caskey followed up with his acoustic project, "Music To Die To". Since then, he has released a steady stream of singles, mixtapes, feature verses, and has released 2 albums, "Clockwork" and his most recent project with his brother Yelawolf and producer Taysty, "Yelawolf x Blacksheep"

Early life 
At a young age, Caskey would listen to heavy metal as he was into instrumentation. However, his older sister got him interested in rap groups such as N.W.A, and Three 6 Mafia in his elementary school years. Shortly after, he started listening to rappers such as Nas, Eminem, and Dead Prez heavily.

Musical career

2010–2012: Beginnings and signing with Cash Money 
Throughout his childhood, Caskey would write other genres of music, and eventually began writing raps in his sophomore year at Winter Springs High School. Then in his early years, he released two underground mixtapes, Blowin' Out My Mind Vol. 1 and The Intangibles. While recording his third official mixtape Homegrown Vol. 1 he linked up with Orlando area producers The Avengerz. Ever since then, The Avengerz formed a significant part of the production side of his music. A few weeks prior to its release he was in a motorcycle accident, where he suffered pinched nerves in his left arm. On April 20, 2011 Caskey released Homegrown Vol. 1 as a free download.

In August 2012, Caskey released his fourth official mixtape titled No Complaints featuring production primarily by The Avengerz. The mixtape would be heard by Cash Money Records producer DJ Nasty, who would pass it on to CEO Birdman. Upon hearing it and meeting with Caskey, Birdman said he immediately knew he was a star. In early August 2012, Cash Money Records released a video of Caskey officially signing to Cash Money. In the video they also revealed his debut studio album would be released in 2013. Not only did he sign a recording contract, but also a publishing, marketing and merchandising deal with Money Mack Music and Cash Money Marketing LLC respectively. Upon signing he said "I’ve wanted to be a performer my whole life, so signing with Cash Money Records and having this platform to release my music has been a dream. I greatly respect Birdman, Slim and the YMCMB family. I look forward to making the city of Orlando, my fans and my label proud." To celebrate he released "Cash Money Records 100 Bars" on September 13.

2012–present: The Transient Classics, Black Sheep, and The Lost Files 
On December 8, 2012, he released his debut single "Keep It on the Low" featuring Kyle Denmead from the No Complaints mixtape. He had a solo track titled "FBGM" on the YMCMB mixtape Rich Gang: All Stars, which was released on February 18, 2013. Then on February 25, 2013, Cash Money re-released No Complaints with two bonus tracks. He was featured on the Cash Money Records compilation album Rich Gang, on the song "Sunshine" also featuring Birdman, Limp Bizkit and Flo Rida. Artistdirect would call the song one of the album's standout tracks.

On June 24, 2013, Caskey announced that his upcoming mixtape would be titled The Transient Classics. On July 16, he revealed the cover art for The Transient Classics and announced it would be released on his 21 birthday, August 28, 2013. On August 20, 2013 he released the music video for the song "Show Me Some", which was shot in Paris, France. The mixtape was produced by The Avengerz, Myles William and The Colleagues and featured guest appearances from Trae tha Truth, Machine Gun Kelly, Riff Raff, JellyRoll, Rittz, and others. Upon its release it was met with positive reviews from music critics. His debut album was recorded at The Hit Factory in Miami, its release was and debuted on 2014. On April 14, 2015 Caskey released a mixtape titled "The Lost Files."

Personal life 
His father died by suicide when Caskey was sixteen years old. He wrote the songs "Letter to My Father" and "Been Solid" on the No Complaints mixtape, as a tribute to him.

Discography

Studio albums

Collaborative albums

Compilation albums

Mixtapes

References

External links 
 Official site
 Caskey on Facebook
 Caskey on YouTube

Living people
American male rappers
Cash Money Records artists
Rappers from Florida
21st-century American rappers
21st-century American male musicians
1992 births